Phyllodactylus pumilus is a species of gecko. It is endemic to Ecuador.

References

Phyllodactylus
Reptiles of Ecuador
Reptiles described in 1970